(Parliamentary) Committee on Education (UbU) is a parliamentary committee in the Swedish Riksdag. The committee's areas of responsibility concern School,  Preschool, Higher education, Research on Education, along with Financial aid for students.

The committee's Speaker is Fredrik Malm from the Liberas since 2022 and the vice-Speaker is Åsa Westlund from the Social Democratic Party since 2022.

List of speakers for the committee

List of vice-speakers for the committee

References

External links
Riksdag – Utbildningsutskottet Riksdag – Education Committee

Committees of the Riksdag